The Kiss is a surviving 1916 American silent comedy film directed by Dell Henderson and written by Harvey F. Thew. The film stars Owen Moore, Marguerite Courtot, Kate Lester, Virginia Hammond, Adolphe Menjou, and Thomas O'Keefe. The film was released on October 19, 1916, by Paramount Pictures.

Plot

Cast

Preservation
A print of The Kiss is preserved in the Library of Congress collection Packard Campus for Audio-Visual Conservation.

References

External links

1916 films
1910s English-language films
Silent American comedy films
1916 comedy films
Paramount Pictures films
American black-and-white films
American silent feature films
Films directed by Dell Henderson
1910s American films